The 1993 Jacksonville State Gamecocks football team represented Jacksonville State University as an independent during the 1993 NCAA Division II football season. Led by ninth-year head coach Bill Burgess, the Gamecocks compiled a record of 3–7. Jacksonville State played home games at Paul Snow Stadium in Jacksonville, Alabama.

Schedule

References

Jacksonville State
Jacksonville State Gamecocks football seasons
Jacksonville State Gamecocks football